Elaeonas or Elaionas (Greek: Ελαιώνας meaning olive grove 'the place where olives grow', before 1949: Τρυπιά - Trypia) is a village and a community in the municipal unit of Diakopto, in the northern part of the Peloponnese peninsula, Greece. It is on the Gulf of Corinth, 3 km west of Diakopto and 9 km southeast of Aigio. The Olympia Odos (Greek National Road Α8)  (Patras - Corinth - Athens) passes south of the village. The community consists of the villages Elaionas, Metochi and Terpsithea. In 2011 Elaionas had a population of 671 (712 for the community).

The village lies between the river of Vouraikos and Selinountas in the foothills of Mount Marathia. According to Pausanias, travelers could visit the caverns of Heracles in those foothills. A small marked path off the Old National Highway leads you to these caves.

Population

External links
 Elaionas GTP Travel Pages
 Elaionas in www.ediakopto.gr

See also

List of settlements in Achaea

References

Aigialeia
Diakopto
Populated places in Achaea